Amtrup is a surname. Notable people with the surname include:

Jon Amtrup (born 1968), Norwegian author, journalist, and sailor
Walter Amtrup (1904–1974), German actor, film dubber, opera singer, and acting teacher